Servetto–Makhymo–Beltrami TSA is a professional cycling team based in Italy, which competes in elite road bicycle racing events such as the UCI Women's World Tour.

Team history
For the 2015 season Veronica Cornolti, Marina Likhanova, Anna Potokina and Sari Saarelainen signed contract extensions. On November 5 Elena Kuchinskaya signed with the team. On November 8 the team signed Tatiana Antoshina and Elena Franchi. On November 11 Manuela Sonzogni signed with the team. On November 13 Vittoria Bussi and Riccarda Mazzotta joined the team. On October 30, Annalisa Cucinotta left the team, joining  for the 2015 season.

Team roster

Major wins

2014
Stage 2 (ITT) Gracia-Orlová, Natalia Boyarskaya
 Overall Tour of Adygeya, Natalia Boyarskaya
Points classification, Natalia Boyarskaya
Stages 1 (ITT) & 2, Natalia Boyarskaya
2015
Ljubljana–Domžale–Ljubljana TT, Tatiana Antoshina
2017
 Overall Clasica Alcaldia de Anapoima, Ana Sanabria
Stage 3, Ana Sanabria
Stage 1 Vuelta a Cundinamarca, Ana Sanabria
 Overall Vuelta Al Tolima, Ana Sanabria 
Stages 1 & 2, Ana Sanabaria
 Overall Clásica de El Carmen de Viboral, Ana Sanabria
Stage 3, Ana Sanabaria
 Overall Vuelta Femenino del Porvenir, Ana Sanabria
Stages 1 & 4, Ana Sanabria
 Overall Vuelta a Colombia y Oro Paz, Ana Sanabria
Prologue, Stages 3 & 5, Ana Sanabria
2018
Memorial Diego e Stefano Trovó, Katja Jeretina
Stage 1 Tour of Zhoushan Island, Argiro Milaki
Time Trial, South American Games, Ana Sanabria
Road Race, South American Games, Ana Sanabria
Track (Team Pursuit), South American Games, Jessica Parra
Track (Madison), South American Games, Jessica Parra
 Sprints classification Tour Cycliste Féminin International de l'Ardèche, Kseniya Dobrynina
 Combativity classification, Kseniya Dobrynina 
 Overall Vuelta a Colombia Femenina, Ana Sanabria
Stage 3 (ITT), Ana Sanabria

National champions

2014
 Italy Track (Scratch Race), Annalisa Cucinotta
2015 
 Russia Time Trial, Tatiana Antoshina
 Russia Road Race, Anna Potokina
 Switzerland Road Race, Jolanda Neff
 European Mountainbike (XC), Jolanda Neff
2016
 European Mountainbike (XC), Jolanda Neff
 Latvia Road Race, Lija Laizāne 
 Latvia Time Trial, Lija Laizāne 
 World Mountainbike (Marathon), Jolanda Neff
2017
 Kazakhstan Time Trial, Natalya Sokovnina
 Cyprus Road Race, Antri Christoforou
 Cyprus Mountainbike (XC), Antri Christoforou
2018
 Greece Road Race, Argiro Milaki
 Greece Track (Keirin), Argiro Milaki
 Greece Track (Scratch Race), Argiro Milaki
2019
 Italy Cyclo-cross, Sara Casasola
 Russia Road Race, Aleksandra Goncharova
 Russia Track (Team Pursuit), Aleksandra Goncharova

References

External links

Cycling teams based in Italy
UCI Women's Teams
Cycling teams established in 2013